Before Unification as the Canadian Armed Forces in 1968, the Canadian military had three distinct services: the Royal Canadian Navy, the Royal Canadian Air Force, and the Canadian Army.  All three services had a Regular (full-time) component and a reserve (part-time) component.  The rank structure for these services were based on the services of the British military, the Royal Navy, the Royal Air Force, and the British Army.  The change to a "Canadian" rank structure meant that many of the traditional (British) rank titles and insignia were removed or changed.

Relative ranks and responsibilities

The ranks of the new Canadian Armed Forces did not match up exactly with the ranks (and attendant responsibilities) of the old system.

In the army, for example, an infantry platoon would have a sergeant for a second in command and a staff sergeant would serve as a company quartermaster sergeant.  In the new Canadian Forces, however, a warrant officer would fill both those roles.  While an infantry section was commanded by a corporal pre-unification, after unification that task fell on a sergeant.  The rank of corporal in the army was especially downgraded in terms of responsibility; before unification a Canadian corporal was the equivalent of a sergeant in most other armies due to his responsibility as a section commander. After unification, the rank of corporal became nothing more than a pay raise with authority being granted instead to the new master corporals.  Equivalents in the table below are very approximate, then.

Certain ranks have alternative titles according to tradition and the trade of the soldier.
The rank of Private (trained) uses the following names (note that all privates prior to receiving their trade qualifications are called privates)
Royal Canadian Armoured Corps – trooper
Royal Regiment of Canadian Artillery – gunner
Royal Canadian Engineers – sapper
Royal Canadian Corps of Signals - signaller
Royal Canadian Infantry Corps
Guards regiments – guardsman
Rifle regiments – rifleman
Fusilier regiments – fusilier
Royal Canadian Electrical and Mechanical Engineers – craftsman
Royal Canadian Air Force - aviator

Lance corporals
Royal Regiment of Canadian Artillery – lance bombardier

Corporals
Royal Regiment of Canadian Artillery – bombardier

Master corporals
Royal Regiment of Canadian Artillery – master bombardier

Pre-Unification Services

Pre-unification RCN

Officer's Insignia 
The RCN used the rank and insignia of the RN.

RCN Officers wore Gold Stripes with the naval "executive curl" above to denote rank. Also Similar to that of the Royal Navy, the patterns of the insignia would denote which part of the navy the officer served in. The standard braid would indicate an officer of RCN (the regular force), a zig-zag design an officer of the Royal Canadian Naval Volunteer Reserve (RCNVR, nicknamed the "Wavy Navy") and a star of david pattern an officer of the Royal Canadian Naval Reserve. After 1945, the RCNVR and the RCNR were merged to form the Royal Canadian Naval Reserve and in the mid-1950's, the RCNR later adopted the same officer's pattern of the regular RCN.

Also following the RN Practise in the 1950's, the rank of Acting Sub Lieutenant was officially introduced to roughly match that of an Army Second Lieutenant or an RCAF Pilot Officer.

Ratings Insignia 
Following the RN practise, Non-commissioned personnel were known as Ratings.

From the RCN's creation in 1910 until about 1950, the only Ratings were that of Ordinary Seaman, Able Seaman, Leading Seaman, Petty Officer and Chief Petty Officer. Rank-wise, an Able Seaman would be the rough equivalent of an Army Lance Corporal and a Leading Seaman (also known as a "Killick") would roughly match that of a Corporal. A Petty Officer depending on length of service would match that of a Sergeant or Staff Sergeant and a Chief Petty Officer of that of an Army Warrant Officer.

Good Conduct Chevrons were worn by Rating's up to the rank of Petty Officer on the upper sleeve (worn directly under the rank badges of Leading Seamen and Petty Officer's or alone by Ordinary and Able Seamen).

 1 Chevron - 3 Years Good Conduct or "Undetected Crime"
 2 Chevrons - 8 Years Good Conduct or "Undetected Crime"
 3 Chevrons - 13 or more Years Good Conduct or "Undetected Crime"

Starting around the 1950's, the RCN's Ratings rank structure was changed to match closer to that of the Army's. As such, the ranks of Petty Officer 2nd Class and Petty Officer 1st Class were introduced to match those of an army/RCAF Sergeant and Staff Sergeant/Flight Sergeant respectively. Likewise, the ranks of Chief Petty Officer 2nd Class and Chief Petty Officer 1st Class were similarly introduced to match those of an army/RCAF Warrant Officer Class II and Warrant Officer Class I respectively.

Good Conduct Chevrons were continued to be worn up to the rank of Petty Officer 1st Class until Unification of the Canadian Armed Forces in 1968.

Similar to that of the Army, the Crown worn with insignia until 1983 was the Tudor Crown. After 1953, it was replaced by the St. Edward's Crown.

Pre-unification army

Army officers' insignia before unification consisted of several rank badges based on British Army designs:

 The star of the Order of the Bath, commonly called a "pip", in sequence of one, two or three as necessary.
 The crown (the Tudor Crown from 1902 to 1953, the St. Edward's Crown from 1953 to the present). 
 The Mameluke sword, crossed by a baton, was used in general officer's insignia.

Army warrant officers also used rank badges based on British designs:

 A warrant officer class I wore the royal coat of arms of Canada; before the 1950s, the British royal coat of arms was worn.
 A warrant officer class II wore a crown (either St. Edward's pattern or Tudor pattern, as described under officers' insignia above) within a wreath.
 During the Second World War, a warrant officer class III had worn a plain crown; this rank was abolished in practice during, and officially after, the war.

Finally, Army NCOs also used rank badges based on British designs:

 Rank badges were constructed from white herringbone lace sewn into 1-, 2-, or 3-bar chevrons.  A crown was worn over the chevrons for staff sergeants.

Pre-unification RCAF

The RCAF for the most part used the rank and insignia of the RAF. The main difference however was where the RAF had only 1 Warrant Officer rank and the use of aircrew ranks, the RCAF used the ranks of Warrant Officer Class II and Warrant Officer Class I similar to that of the Canadian Army and had no air crew ranks.

Around 1953, the RCAF changed its other ranks / airmen's insignia from blue-black to grey/silver.

Unified Canadian Forces

A series of gold stripes was instituted, similar to the pre-unification naval and air force rank system in concept but very different in appearance.  Warrant officers retained the traditional army-style rank badges, and NCOs' chevrons were also changed, being smaller and made from newer material.  The maple leaf also featured on NCO badges, even being worn over a private's one-bar chevron in initial issues of the new insignia in the years immediately after unification.  The nickname for this short-lived rank was Trade Corporal.

Generals' and admirals' insignia remained similar to pre-unification army insignia, with maple leaves replacing the stars, but retaining the crown and crossed sabre and baton.  A wide band of gold braid was also used, similar to pre-unification naval insignia worn by admirals. Naval officers of flag rank removed the rank epaulettes on the service dress on June 11, 2010, when the executive curl was reinstated with additional sleeve ribbon for the admiral ranks.

Changes: Navy
Naval rank titles remained for the personnel of the new Maritime Command.  On the Canadian Forces service uniform, the rank insignia of officers up to the rank of naval Captain followed the old Royal Canadian Navy pattern but with the executive curl deleted.  However, the executive curl was permitted on naval mess dress for all naval officers.  In 1985 a new naval service uniform was announced and was introduced into service over the following three years. Admirals lost their sleeve ranks entirely and began wearing the maple leaf ranks on shoulder straps as their Army and Air Force counterparts. 

For non-commissioned members, the unique naval anchor insignias were deleted and replaced with the same system as the Army and Air Force.

Changes: Army

While the insignia for non-commissioned personnel of the CF very closely matched that of the pre-unification army, there were some changes and new classes of ranks were created.  The army had previously had general officers, officers, warrant officers, senior NCOs, junior NCOs, and men. All personnel that were not officers were referred to collectively as "other ranks". After unification, in mid 1980’s other ranks became known as non-commissioned members (NCMs).  The category of senior NCOs now included only one rank – that of sergeant – whereas before it had included both staff sergeants and sergeants.  There were also three grades of warrant officer, whereas immediately before unification there had been only two.

The appointments of lance corporal and lance sergeant were deleted.  Originally, there were only privates and corporals below the rank of sergeant.  Those corporals with leadership training came to be referred to as "B" corporals (for having completed Part B of the leadership training) and started to wear a crown over their two chevrons.  Eventually the crown was changed to a maple leaf surmounting the chevrons, and the appointment of master corporal was created after much hostility and confusion within the ranks regarding who would be providing leadership at the lowest levels of Mobile Command (the new name for what used to be the Army).

Officers had their "pips and crowns" insignia deleted entirely and replaced with naval style bars or sleeve rings. General officers continued to wear their rank insignia on the shoulders, but now using maple leaves that were embroidered into the shoulder straps rather than the previous pin on metal devices.

Changes: Air Force

The distinctive air force rank titles were eliminated, and Air Command used the same rank titles and insignia as Mobile Command.

Post-unification Canadian Forces

On June 11, 2010 the executive curl was reinstated for use by all naval officers, but the rank of midshipman was not reinstated, and the rank of naval cadet stayed on.  The rank insignia for non-commissioned members continued to be based on army pattern insignia.

On 8 July 2013 the Minister of National Defence, Peter MacKay, announced that Canadian Army officers would once again wear "pips and crowns", signalling a return to the pre-unification rank insignia. The final product was a return to the rank insignia used before 1920 by the army, with the reinstatement of the brigadier-general insignia of crossed sabre and baton.

Peter MacKay, Minister of National Defence, announced on 8 July 2013 the Government of Canada's intent to restore Canadian Army rank insignia, names and badges to their traditional forms. The first stage was to be done before the end of the year for the officer corps, and resulted to a return to the pre-1968 rank insignia, but brigadier generals instead had the pre-1920 insignia (and not the 1928–66 insignia for brigadiers) reinstated. All other army officers had by November 11, 2014, insignia based on the old pre-1968 pattern. In 2016, the Canadian Army ordered that general officer rank insignia would be modified to a version of the insignia worn under the unification era, except that it would conform to the traditional Canadian Army style in using the same metal pin-on ranks as other Canadian Army officers instead of the slightly different cloth badging worn under unification.

In 2015 the rank of private was changed to aviator within the Royal Canadian Air Force. The RCAF insignia were also changed from gold to the grey/silver colouring that existed prior to unification. As this restoration aimed at carrying on the traditions of the RCAF, and also of the First World War–era Royal Flying Corps (and other CAF air branches), it did not signify a wholesale reversion to the post–Second World War–era RCAF ranks.

On April 1, 2016, the Canadian Army announced that it would use the maple leaf ranks for generals as well as reinstating gold sleeve braids on generals' tunic cuffs. The insignia, however, will use metal pin-ons instead of the unification cloth badges. To honour the centennial of the Battle of Vimy Ridge on 1 April 2017, the Vimy Star, composed of a red maple leaf within a gold diamond and surrounded by the army's Latin motto  ("we stand on guard for thee", from the English lyrics of "O Canada"), replaced the Bath Star in officer shoulder boards.

See also
 Canadian Armed Forces ranks and insignia
 Historic Royal Canadian Air Force ranks (1924–1968)
 Ranks and insignia of NATO
 List of comparative military ranks
 Comparative army officer ranks of the Americas
 Uniforms of the Canadian Armed Forces
 Cadets Canada Elemental Ranks

References

External links
 RCN Officer's Rank Insignia 1910 - 1968
 Ratings Rank Insignia 1910 - C1950
 Ratings Rank Insignia 1950 - 1968
 A complete guide to pre-Unification Army insignia and ranks